Dr Harendra Prasad Singh is an Indian politician and a member of 17th Legislative Assembly Uttar Pradesh state of India. He represents the Zafarabad constituency in Jaunpur of Uttar Pradesh. He contested Uttar Pradesh Assembly Election as Bharatiya Janata Party candidate and defeated his close rival Sachindra Nath Tripathi from Samajwadi Party with a margin of 24,865 votes.

Political career
Harendra Prasad Singh is a member of the 17th Legislative Assembly of Uttar Pradesh. He is a member of Bharatiya Janata Party.

Posts held

See also
Uttar Pradesh Legislative Assembly

References

Year of birth missing (living people)
Living people
Bharatiya Janata Party politicians from Uttar Pradesh
Uttar Pradesh MLAs 2017–2022